The Mayor of Filbert is a 1919 silent American drama film, directed by Christy Cabanne. It stars Jack Richardson, Belle Bennett, and J. Barney Sherry, and was released on May 25, 1919.

Cast list
 Jack Richardson as Mayor Johann Schmidt/Charles Smith
 Belle Bennett as Mollie Vaughn
 J. Barney Sherry as Dr. Loring
 Bennie Alexander as Carroll
 George Pearce as Royal Denman
 Wilbur Higby as Roger Taft
 Bill Dyer as Mike McCarthy
 Joseph E. Singleton as Jim Grimes
 Millicent Fisher as Mrs. Grimes
 Louise Lester as Belle Glover

References

External links

Films directed by Christy Cabanne
American silent feature films
American black-and-white films
Silent American drama films
1919 drama films
1919 films
1910s English-language films
1910s American films